Todd Raleigh was a collegiate baseball coach who led the Tennessee Volunteers baseball team for the 2008–2011 seasons.  Prior to that position, he was the head coach at Western Carolina, his alma mater.

Year-by-year head coaching record

External links
Official Bio @ UTSports.com

References

Living people
1969 births
Tennessee Volunteers baseball coaches
East Carolina Pirates baseball coaches
Western Carolina Catamounts baseball coaches
Western Carolina University alumni
Baseball players from Vermont